The Minolta 5000i (also known as the Maxxum 5000i in North America, the Dynax 5000i in Europe, and the α-5700i in Japan) is a 35mm single-lens reflex camera belonging to the second generation of bodies in Minolta's autofocus SLR system, fitting between the cheaper 3000i and the more expensive, semi-pro 7000i,
and replacing the 5000.  The "i" in the names of the new camera range stood for "intelligence".
Like the 7000i, the 5000i supported Minolta's Creative Expansion Cards, plug-in electronic modules that added new functionality to the camera.

The 5000i uses Minolta's second generation wide-area autofocus sensor, giving single-shot autofocus including predictive autofocus on a moving subject; continuous AF is available with the optional Sports Action expansion card.  The camera's available exposure modes out of the box were Program (using a 2-area evaluative metering system) and Manual (with a center-weighted averaging meter).  Aperture priority and shutter priority are available with the optional A/S Mode expansion card.

Unlike the 7000i, the 5000i includes a built-in flash, rigidly mounted on the pentaprism; Minolta claimed that this was "the world's most compact AF SLR camera with built-in flash".
The flash fires automatically in Program mode if the camera determines that the shutter speed will be too low to hand-hold, or that the main subject is backlit.
The flash can be turned off if not desired and can be manually selected in Manual mode.  The X-sync shutter speed is 1/90 second. A proprietary Minolta flash shoe atop the pentaprism allows the use of dedicated Minolta flashes.

References

135 film cameras
5000i